The demographics of Guam details an array of demographic statistics relating to the territory of Guam. This includes statistics on population, including the Indigenous population; religious affiliations; language; and immigration. The Demographics of Guam provides an overview of the history of Guam, as well as a depiction of the villages in the United States territory and its populace. The population of Guam, as of July 2021 was 168,801. 

The demographics of Guam include the demographic features of the population of Guam, including population density, ethnicity, education level, health of the populace, economic status, religious affiliations and other aspects of the population.

Population 
While there are no large cities in Guam, the populace resides in villages. The most populated village in Guam is Dededo, with a population of 44,943 in 2010. The Indigenous people of Guam are known as the Chamorro people, and are the largest ethnic group in Guam. This group is categorised as a minority group in the United States territory. The 2021 mean age in the territory of Guam was 31.4 years. Guam is the largest and most populated of the territories in the Mariana Islands.

The population density of Guam is approximately 0.31 people per square metre. The total land area is 544 km2. 94.9% of Guam's population lives in urban regions.

In the 2020 U.S. Census, Guam had a population of 153,836. This was a 3.5 percent decrease from the population of 159,358 in the 2010 Census.

Births and deaths

CIA World Factbook demographic statistics 
The following demographic statistics are from the CIA World Factbook.

Age structure
0–14 years: 27.22% (male 23,748/female 22,122)
15–24 years: 16.08% (male 14,522/female 12,572)
25–54 years: 36.65% (male 31,880/female 29,871)
55–64 years: 10.5% (male 9,079/female 8,610)
65 years and over: 9.54% (male 7,504/female 8,577) (2020 est.)

Population
169,086 as of 2022

Population growth rate
0.16%

Birth rate
18.56 births/1,000 population

Death rate
6.03 deaths/1,000 population

Net migration rate
-10.96 migrant(s)/1,000 population

Sex ratio
At birth: 1.07 male(s)/female
0–14 years: 1.07 male(s)/female
15–24 years: 1.16 male(s)/female
25–54 years: 1.07 male(s)/female
55–64 years: 1.07 male(s)/female
65 years and over: 0.71 male(s)/female
Total population: 1.06 male(s)/female (2022 est.)

Infant mortality rate
Total: 11.46 deaths/1,000 live births
Male: 11.49 deaths/1,000 live births
Female: 11.44 deaths/1,000 live births (2022 est.)

Life expectancy at birth
Total population: 77.5 years
Male: 75.07 years
Female: 80.08 years

Total fertility rate
2.78 children born/woman

Nationality
noun: Guamanian / Guamanians
adjective: Guamanian

Ethnic groups
Chamorro 37.3%
Filipino 26.3%
White 7.1%
Chuukese 7%
Korean 2.2%
Other Pacific Islander 2%
Other Asian 2%
Chinese 1.6%
Palauan 1.6%
Japanese 1.5%
Pohnpeian  1.4%
Mixed 9.4%
Other 0.6%

Religion
According to the Pew Research Center, 2010:

Roman Catholic 75%
Protestants 17.7%
Unaffiliated 1.7%
Other religions 1.6%
Folk religions 1.5%
Other Christians 1.4%
Buddhists 1.1%
Eastern Orthodox <1%
Hindu <1%
Muslim <1%
Jews <1%

The Church of Jesus Christ of Latter-day Saints (LDS Church) reported 2,550 members in the LDS Church in Guam in 5 congregations as of December 31, 2019.  On May 4, 2019, the church broke ground for a temple in Yigo.

Languages
English 43.6%
 Filipino 21.2%
Chamorro 17.8%
Other Pacific island languages 10%
Other Asian languages 6.3%
Other 1.1%

History 
Guam is known to be the first inhabited island in the Pacific Island, discovered by the Spaniards in 1521. After Guam was discovered by Ferdinand Magellan under the flag of Spain, the island was repeatedly invaded by alien military forces. The island was officially claimed by Spain in 1565. It was the first island as well as the Mariana Islands, inhabited by humans in Remote Oceania. Guam has since been occupied by outside entities for over 330 years. 

Magellan arrived on the shores of Guam with three ships, the Trinidad, the Conception and the Victoria. The population of Guam in the mid 16th century was severely reduced, due to the bloodshed caused by the Spaniards, as well as the many diseases carried by the Europeans. Guam was ceded to the United States after the Spanish–American War in 1898. It was then taken by the Japanese in 1941 during World War II. It was retaken by the United States in 1944.

While Guam merely covers 520 km squared of land area, the United States territory is considered to be of international significance, due to geopolitics, as well as the strategic importance of Guam's straits, islands and canals. Guam is the largest landfall, for use of communications, military bases and shipping. Guam was utilised as a military base in World War II against the Japanese.

Guam is a multi-ethnic island, with settlers from the Philippines, Korea, Japan and China forming part of its populace. Guam was first settled by migrants from the Philippines in 1,500 to 1,400 BCE.

The Chamorro people 
The Mariana Islands is an ethnic and cultural heritage of the Chamorro people.  Despite the invasion attempts from leading military countries, such as Spain, The United States of America and Japan, the Chamorro people have maintained their traditions. The cultural endurance of the Chamorro people was evident, as the Indigenous peoples of the Mariana Islands maintained their language, tradition and integrity, in spite of the dominance of imperialism. While Guam has remained a colony in the postmodern world, the Chamorro people of Guam have gained an amount of local political control of the island traditions.

In pre-Spanish times, CHamoru clans were divided into two distinct, ranked social castes.  Social castes are different from social classes in that individuals are born into a particular caste and their status, therefore, could not be changed.  Social classes, on the other hand, are more fluid and members can move between classes.  The upper caste was known as chamorri, and the lower caste was known as manachang.   Movement in between these castes, such as through marriage, was prohibited.  Concubines or other relationships could be maintained only within one’s social class.   In addition, the chamorri caste was divided into an upper noble class called matao and a middle, or demi-noble class, known as acha’ot.

Architecture 
The most prominent historical architectural complex in Guam is latte architecture. This style of architecture is described as village complexes with both residential and communal functions. This structure is unique, as the width is constant in all sizes of latte architecture, however the height of the complex differs from small, medium and large. Latte architecture is unique to Guam and the Mariana Islands. 

These types of villages were utilised as expressions of a collective identity, rather than modes of competition or rank. The latte structures were tropes for social organisation as well as a Micronesian egalitarian and matrilineal clan. This system incorporated hierarchical authority that was founded on respect and reciprocity, rather than totalitarian power or unequal distributions of wealth.

Environment 
Climate change in Guam is rife throughout the US Island territory and is a pressing issue, as well as a cause for concern for its populace.

Increased Air Temperatures
There has been increasing rising temperatures in daytime and nighttime air temperatures in Guam. The annual number of hot days in Guam had increased, with an average of five days a year exceeding the temperature of 31.1 °C (88 °F). It is estimated that 70% of days the year in Guam will potentially experience temperatures over 32 °C (90 °F). Furthermore, cool nights (below 23.3 °C/74 °F) in Guam have significantly decreased. The 2017 National Oceanic and Atmospheric Administration's (NOAA) National Centers for Environmental Information (NCRI) report found that the number of cold nights in Guam have decreased from an average of forty nights per year in 1995, to zero per year since 2005. Increased air temperatures is an area of concern, partucularly in regards to public health, building construction and utilities.

Rainfall 
Drought conditions are expected to be more frequent in Guam in the near future, due to decreased amounts of rainfall in the island territory. Overall, Guam is likely to become drier in the future, which is an underlying threat to ecosystems and the populace of Guam. This issue formulates difficulties in attaining fresh water.

Tropical Storms and Typhoons 
The intensity of tropical storms are expected to increase in Guam. While Tropical cyclones will likely decrease in the near future, the cyclones that do form will be more extremely intense and of a higher category, ultimately creating higher wind speeds. Guam is situated in one of the most active regions for tropical cyclones in the world.

Sea levels 
Rising sea levels in Guam produce threats to infrastructure, and is expected to damage natural and built assets in the island territory. This is due to the fact that rising sea levels creates extreme coastal erosion, flooding and saltwater intrusion into coastal aquifers. Changes in sea levels and cyclone occurrence has resulted in increased water frequency and coastal erosion. High water can create issues, such as the erosion of buildings and infrastructure, as well as vegetation.

Changes to the Ocean 
As a result of human activities, the chemical composition, temperature and circulation of oceans have significantly changed, which is concerning for marine ecosystems. The increased rising temperatures of the sea surface directly causes coral reef bleaching, and is likely to worsen in the near future. This is a major issue, due to the fact that coral reefs and ocean ecosystems in Guam facilitate tourism, contributing millions of dollars to Guam's economy. The intensity and frequency of heat stress has increased. From 2013 to 2017, more than one third of Guam's shallow corals were bleached and died, as a result of rising heat levels in the ocean.

Issues in relation to Climate Change in Guam 
Climate change is a concept that pervades the entirety of the globe, and is no different in the US island territory of Guam. An array of groups, such as the elderly, children and low-income communities are disproportionately affected by climate change. Extreme weather and climate shifts will likely disrupt of the fabric of Guamanian society. In relation to human health, rising heat temperatures are a cause for concern, particularly in regards to heat related illnesses. Extreme storms and heatwaves are likely to aggravate existing illnesses, increasing the transition of disease. The decreased amount of rainfall in Guam, as well as the rise in heat temperatures facilitate an increased demand for fresh water. This additionally causes a decreased supply of fresh water. The increased droughts in Guam, as a result of the lack of rainfall has caused an increased dependency on well water. The amalgamation of potential pumping, droughts and rising sea levels may cause saltwater contamination in wells. Therefore, water conservation may be necessary in the near future, to prevent the depletion and access to fresh water in Guam.

See also 
 Guamanian citizenship and nationality

References

 
Guam
Society of Guam